Aminjikarai, originally Amaindakarai, is one of the oldest neighbourhoods in Chennai, Tamil Nadu, India. The arterial Poonamallee High Road (NH 4) runs through it. Aminjikarai was annexed to Madras District in the year 1946, and Arumbakkam and Anna Nagar were carved out of Aminjikarai in the 1950s and 1970s.  The Nelson Manickam Road that traverses through Aminjikarai is an important commercial road in Chennai city.

History
A delta formed from the deposition of the sediment carried by the river Cooum towards its journey to the Bay of Bengal is called Amainda Karai (which means shaped/formed/created banks / land in Tamil) and later on Aminjikarai colloquially.

According to another version, the name derived from the word amanjutal, which means 'free community service'. Probably, at some stage, the banks of Cooum at this point (at Amanjikarai) should have broken, and the local people should have offered free community service in rebuilding the banks (karai) of the river.

In the early days, it was known as a suburb after the tollgate (near Pachaiyappa's College). Now, it is a central part of Chennai which links the residential Anna Nagar to the central business district of Chennai. It comprises Mehta Nagar, Gill Nagar, Railway Colony, Collectorate Colony and Ayyavoo Naidu Colony.

Mehta Nagar is connected by a small pedestrian bridge and it is almost like a peninsula. Thiru-vi-ka park is a well known park that is close by Aminijikarai.

Culture

Aminjikarai hosts Sri Ekambareshwara Kamakshi Amma temple and very close to this is Sri Varadaraja temple. Because of these two temples in very close vicinity some people refer to Aminjikarai as mini Kancheepuram.  The Mangali Amma temple (Ellai Amma) is also located in between Toll-gate and Aminjikarai. Ekambareshwara and Varadaraja temple's Brahmotsavam is a famous festival held between March and May of every year. Pradosham is also a famous event at the Ekambareshwara temple. Near that ekhambareswarer temple, there is vinayagar temple called " Varasidhi Vinayagar temple". It is well popular for vinayagar chathurthi festival.

Aminjikarai also has a mosque and burial ground on Poonamallee high road. The name of the mosque is Jammia Masjid. 
There is another masjid in Nelson Manickam road called Fathima Islamic cultural society

There are also numerous churches.

Infrastructure
Aminjikarai offers shopping facilities for people of all classes. and famous photo studio called my memories event management.The Aminjikarai Market hosts very fresh vegetables, some roadside makeshift vegetable shops offer very fresh vegetables at nominal rates. There is a huge shopping mall - Ampa Skywalk at the intersection of Nelson Manickam Road and Poonamallee High Road. The mall has 7 multiplex cinemas, spacious hypermarket, food court, restaurants and branded retail outlets.

The nearest suburban railway station is Nungambakkam railway station, which is just  from Aminjikarai. The proximity to the Chennai Metropolitan Bus Terminus (CMBT) has made Aminjikarai one of the most accessible routes in Chennai.

Aminjikarai has many hospitals, including Billroth Hospitals which is a fully fledged multispeciality hospital. MR hospital a dedicated Renal (kidney) Transplant centre is located on the Govindan street.

In popular culture
Aminjikarai is usually referenced in Tamil film comedy scenes. The name is usually compared with America as a play on words to contrast someone locally from Aminjikarai with someone from a Western society.

See also
 List of neighbourhoods in Chennai

References

External links

Neighbourhoods in Chennai